Marcel Gaumont was a French sculptor born on 27 January 1880 in Tours.  He died in Paris on 20 November 1962.

Biography

Gaumont was a pupil at the École nationale supérieure des Beaux-Arts in Paris and studied under Louis-Ernest Barrias, François-Léon Sicard  and Jules Coutan. He was the joint winner of the 1908 "Prix de Rome" along with Camille Crenier and this took him to Rome's Villa Médicis from 1909 to 1912. He exhibited regularly at the Salon de la Société des artistes français and in 1935 won their gold medal. In 1937 his four Metopes won the major prize at the  Exposition internationale de Paris. These works had decorated the western façade of the Palais de Tokyo at that exhibition. In 1938 he was made an officer of the "Légion d'honneur". In 1939 he became professor at the École des Beaux-Arts in Paris and in 1944 he was elected to the French Académie des Beaux-Arts taking the chair vacated by Paul Gasq.

Works from Gaumont's time studying at the Beaux-arts de Paris, l'école nationale supérieure

Figure modelée d'après l'antique

This was Gaumont's submission to the school's 1900 competition for a  "figure modelée" in the classical mode.

Psyché

This was Gaumont's marble Ronde-bosse executed whilst a pupil at the school.

Le jeune Sophocle après la victoire de Salamine

This was the plaster composition with which Gaumont shared the "Prix de Rome". The work is kept in the archives of the École nationale supérieure des beaux-arts in Paris

Other works

The tomb of Albert Roussel

The composer is buried in the cemetery of the Sainte-Valérie church in Varengeville-sur-mer

Daphnis et Chloé

This composition in Bourgogne stone dates to 1926 and is held by the Musée des Beaux-Arts de Tours.

Reliefs on the entrance to the Fondation Biermans-Lapôtre building in the Cité Internationale Universitaire de Paris
This university in Paris' 14th arrondissement and near the Porte d'Orléans includes  a series of ēresidences for the students built in the style of various countries,
The Fondation Biermans-Lapôtre building is that built in the Flemish style mainly to house students from Belgium, Gaumont created reliefs on the building's entrance.

Le Printemps

This statuette in plaster was commissioned from Gaumont by the Architect Albert Laprade for the bathroom of the "Studium" pavilion at the 1925 Paris  internationale des Arts décoratifs exhibition. It is held in the collection of the Musee Antoine Lecuyer in Saint-Quentin

Statue of Pierre Belain d'Esnambuc

This work can be seen at Fort-de-France in Martinique. The inauguration took place on 15 September 1935.
Another work designed by Pierre Leprince Ringuet, the statue can be seen in the "Parc de la Savane".

Reliefs for the 1937 Exposition internationale des arts et des techniques

Gaumont executed four bas- reliefs "Triton", "Trois Nymphes", "Centaure" and "Eros" for the exhibition. They now decorate the exterior wall of the Musée d'Art Moderne de la Ville de Paris.

The Cambrai Belfry

The belfry was the only part of the church of Saint-Martin to survive the French Revolution when the church was destroyed and in 1922 Gaumont was commissioned to add four sculptures to the corners of the belfry tower. These depicted four figures from Cambrai history; a Frankish warrior, a soldier of the militia, Louise de Savoie, the mother of François 1st who signed the 1529 "Paix des Dames" and the Marquis de Cézen, the first governor after Cambrai was reunited with France in 1667.

Cambrai Chamber of Commerce

The whole of the centre of Cambrai was destroyed by the Germans in 1918 and the Chamber of Commerce building emerged from the reconstruction with decoration by Gaumont and Paul Simon.

Works in conjunction with the Manufacture nationale de Sèvres

From 1920 onwards Gaumont often collaborated with Sèvres. One such work in "biscuit de porcelaine" was called "Petit coursier". Other Sèvres works include "Joueuses de Boules", "La mort de Narcisse", "Samson et Dalila", "Le sommeil", "Enfants a la flèche" and  "L'amour Endormi".

Works in churches and cathedrals

Flesquières. Eglise St Géry

The village of Flesquières was razed to the ground by the Germans in 1918 and Pierre Leprince Ringuet was commissioned to plan the reconstruction. The rebuilding of the church was started in 1923 and the building consecrated in 1926. Gaumont carried out sculptural work both inside and outside the church.

Église Saint-Joseph de la Vacquerie

This church in Villers-Plouich replaced a chapel which was destroyed on the eve of the battle of Cambrai in 1917. It was built between 1923 and 1930 and the designing architect was Pierre Leprince-Ringuet. On the front of the church there is some sculpture around the church's rose window by Gaumont, executed in 1928, and depicting a " Christ in majesty"  surrounded by angels.

Arras Cathedral

During the 1914–1918 war, Arras cathedral was almost totally destroyed and had to be restored in 1920 but further damage was sustained when in 1944 the building was hit by a bomb. There is much to be seen inside the church including the "Stations of the Cross" by Descatoires, several marble statues in the nave given by the église Sainte Geneviève of Paris (the Panthéon) and a pulpit with sculptural decoration by Gaumont who depicts Christ amongst his disciples and the four evangelists; the winged Matthew, Mark with a lion, Luke with a winged bull and John with eagle. Gaumont also added the sculptures on the baptismal font. He depicts Jesus being baptized by John the Baptist and St Vaast blessing a group of the faithful.

Église Saint-Martin d'Abancourt, Nord

This church designed by Pierre Leprince Ringuet was decorated in the arts déco style and Gaumont executed sculpture in moulded cement ("béton moulé") for the church façade.

Église Saint-Quentin de Villers-Plouich

Another church designed between 1924 and 1930 by Pierre Leprince Ringuet to replace the building destroyed in 1917. In June 1928 Gaumont added a depiction of the Crucifixion to the front of the church.

Saint-Martin's church in Masnières
This is one of the five churches restored by Pierre Leprince-Ringuet and Gaumont created several sculptural works including the pediment depicting St Martin handing his cloak to a beggar.

War memorials

Le Monument de la rue Conté

The École centrale des arts et manufactures lost many of her pupils in the 1914–1918 war and Gaumont carried out the sculpture on the school's entrance, carried out in 1923 to honour those 550 "Centraliens" killed.

The Lycée Saint-Louis War Memorial

Gaumont carried out sculptural work for this memorial to the pupils of the Lycée killed in the 1914–1918 war.

Fontainebleau War Memorial

Originally located in the Fontainebleau school of artillery it is now held in the Musée de l’école d’Artillerie in Draguignan

Tours War Memorial

This memorial is located in the Hôtel de Ville, Tours. It stands at the side of the "Escalier d'honneur".

Le Blanc War Memorial

Another cooperation of Gaumont with the architect Pierre Leprince Ringuet.

Laon War Memorial

The Laon war memorial lies at the intersection of the rue du Mont de Vaux, the Avenue Gambetta and the avenue Aristide Briand. The monument is 17 metres high and made from reinforced concrete and Lavoux stone. It was inaugurated in 1926 and  Gaumont has sculpted an image of Minerva, daughter of Jupiter and the goddess of war, wisdom, strategy and intelligence. She carries a shield and a sword which she points downwards.

Le Perreux-sur-Marne War Memorial

Inaugurated 19 June 1921, this limestone statue was a work by Gaumont but based on a maquette by Gausset, Bertand et Cie

The Sorigny War Memorial

Dating to 1923, Gaumont's sculpture for this memorial, given by Gaumont as a gift to a commune where he had spent much of his infant life, depicts an angel of victory with wings spread wide supporting the body of a dead soldier. The architect of the memorial was Maurice Boille.

Memorial to the 88th Regiment Indre-et-Loire

This monument in Tours is dedicated to the 88th "régiment de mobiles" and their role in the 1870–1871 Franco-Prussian war and was inaugurated 12 July 1914. Gaumont sculpted in limestone a soldier protecting a woman who in turn guards the coat of arms of Tours. Behind them another soldier lies either dying or wounded. The monument is positioned just before the Saint-Symphorien bridge. Originally the monument stood in Tours' Place du Chardonnet. The architect was Bernard Chaussemiche.

References

Note

External links

1880 births
1962 deaths
Artists from Paris
French architectural sculptors
Members of the Académie des beaux-arts
École des Beaux-Arts alumni
Artists from Tours, France
Prix de Rome for sculpture
20th-century French sculptors
French male sculptors